S.N. Mathur was the Director of the Indian Intelligence Bureau between September 1975 and February 1980. He was also the Director General of Police in Punjab.

References

Possibly living people
Year of birth missing
Indian police officers
Directors of Intelligence Bureau (India)
Directors of the Central Bureau of Investigation